A Cruel World is the debut album by American heavy metal band Bloodsimple, released on March 29, 2005.

Musical style
In broad terms, Cruel World's songs can be seen as falling into one of three categories, the categories being hardcore but commercially digestible nu metal ("Straight Hate", "Path to Prevail", "What If I Lost It", "Blood in Blood Out", "Cruel World", "Falling Backwards"), Alice in Chains styled alternative metal ("Sell Me Out", "Running from Nothing", "Flatlined"), and two softer alternative rock ballads ("The Leaving Song", "Plunder"). This kind of stylistic direction, to some extent, shows the record carrying on that of From Bliss to Devastation, Tim Williams and Mike Kennedy's main band Vision of Disorder's last release before its split-up.

Production and marketing
The band’s debut record was recorded with rock producer GGGarth Richardson in Vancouver, British Columbia, Canada. Richardson had previously worked with a number of alternative metal acts, including Rage Against the Machine, Slipknot, 40 Below Summer, Chevelle and Trapt. According to the band, Richardson understood the sound the band was seeking and did not attempt to "tone it down".

The record's production was a lengthy process, spanning approximately three years from beginning to end. After an extended period of writing, the band spent three and a half months in the studio. The basic elements of the album, including most of the vocals, were recorded in six weeks. After taking some time off, the band received an initial mix of the record, but were dissatisfied with the results. The record was remixed with more success by Mike Fraser.

Songs
The themes of Cruel World include war ("Straight Hate"), failed relationships ("Leaving Song", "Sell Me Out"), paranoia ("Running from Nothing") and drug addiction ("Flatlined").

The album's first single, the brutal "Straight Hate", was written about American soldiers fighting in Iraq. Vocalist Tim Williams stated that the song was about how difficult it was for the soldiers and that he wanted to write something where the words would help them through the day. Williams denies that the song is political, stating that he does not care about the Government's reasons for deployment of troops to the Gulf.

The song "Flatlined," is about drug addiction, and was written from the perspective of a drug addict who eventually dies. Williams states that one of his best friends, who loved the song, ended up dying in the same way.

The track "Falling Backwards" features a guest performance by Mudvayne's Chad Gray.

"What if I Lost it" was used as the theme music for Fuse TV's Metal Asylum.

Track listing
"Straight Hate" – 4:46
"Path to Prevail" – 3:18
"What If I Lost It" – 3:25
"Blood in Blood Out" – 2:20
"Sell Me Out" – 3:38
"The Leaving Song" – 4:32
"Running from Nothing" – 4:12
"Cruel World" – 3:56
"Flatlined" – 4:14
"Falling Backwards" (feat. Chad Gray of Mudvayne) – 3:51
"Plunder" – 6:45
 This song ends at 3:23 followed by silence until 4:53, at which point a phone conversation fades in which leads to the end of the track.

Personnel 
Tim Williams – Vocals
Mike Kennedy –  guitar
Nick Rowe –  guitar
Kyle Sanders – bass guitar
Chris Hamilton – drums

Charting Positions
Album

Singles

References

2005 debut albums
Bloodsimple albums
Reprise Records albums
Albums produced by Garth Richardson